Sara Serna Abadías is a Spanish football striker currently playing in Segunda División for CE Seagull. She previously played for RCD Espanyol, with whom she also played the 2006-07 European Cup, UE L'Estartit and Levante Las Planas.

She has been an U-19 international.

References

1987 births
Living people
Spanish women's footballers
UE L'Estartit players
Primera División (women) players
RCD Espanyol Femenino players
Women's association football forwards
Footballers from Catalonia
Sportspeople from Sabadell
Sportswomen from Catalonia
FC Levante Las Planas players